A brigandine is a form of body armour from the Middle Ages. It is a garment typically made of heavy cloth, canvas, or leather, lined internally with small oblong steel plates riveted to the fabric, sometimes with a second layer of fabric on the inside.

Origins

Protective clothing and armour have been used by armies from earliest recorded history; the King James Version of the Bible (Jeremiah 46:4) translates the Hebrew סריון ÇiRYON or שריון SiRYoN "coat of mail" as "brigandine". Medieval brigandines were essentially a refinement of the earlier coat of plates, which developed in the late 12th century, typically of simpler construction with larger metal plates. This armour of Asian origin reached Europe after the Mongol invasion in 1240 that destroyed the Kievan Rus' and severely damaged the Kingdom of Hungary in 1241. The new armour became very popular first in Eastern Europe, especially in Hungary, towards the end of the 13th century and was adopted in western Europe several decades later.

Later brigandines appeared towards the end of the 14th century, but survived beyond this transitional period between mail and plate, and came into even wider use in the 15th century, continuing into the 16th century. 15th-century brigandines are generally front-opening garments with the rivets arranged in triangular groups of three, while 16th-century brigandines generally have smaller plates with the rivets arranged in rows.

The brigandine is sometimes confused with the haubergeon, while the name is often confused with the brigantine, a swift small sea vessel.

Construction
The form of the brigandine is essentially the same as the civilian doublet, though it is commonly sleeveless.  However, depictions of brigandines with sleeves are known. The small armour plates were sometimes riveted between two layers of stout cloth, or just to an outer layer. Unlike armour for the torso made from large plates, the brigandine was flexible, with a degree of movement between each of the overlapping plates. Many brigandines appear to have had larger, somewhat L-shaped plates over the central chest area.  The rivets attaching the plates to the fabric were often decorated, being gilt, or of latten, and sometimes embossed with a design. The rivets were also often grouped to produce a repeating decorative pattern. In more expensive brigandines the outer layer of cloth was usually of velvet. The contrast between a richly dyed velvet cloth and gilded rivet heads must have been impressive and, unsurprisingly, such armour was popular with high-status individuals.

Modern flak jackets and ballistic vests are based on the same principle.

Use

A brigandine was commonly worn over a gambeson and mail shirt and it was not long before this form of protection was commonly used by soldiers ranging in rank from archers to knights. It was most commonly used by men-at-arms. These wore brigandines, along with plate armour arm and leg protection, as well as a helmet. Even with the gambeson and the mail shirt, a wearer was not as well-protected as when wearing a complete harness of plate armour, but the brigandine was less expensive and also gave the soldier a greater degree of mobility and flexibility.  A brigandine was also simple enough in design for a soldier to make and repair his own armour without needing the services of an armourer.

A common myth is that brigandines were so-named because they were a popular choice of protection for bandits and outlaws. This is untrue. Originally the term "brigand" referred to a foot soldier, and a brigandine was simply a type of armour worn by a foot soldier. It had nothing to do with its alleged ability to be concealed by bandits. In fact, brigandines were highly fashionable and were ostentatiously displayed by wealthy aristocrats both in European and in Asian courts.

Similar types

European jack of plate 

A similar type of armour was the jack of plate, commonly referred to simply as a "jack" (although this could also refer to any outer garment). This type of armour was used by common medieval European soldiers and the rebel peasants known as Jacquerie.

Like the brigandine, the jack was made of small iron plates between layers of felt and canvas. The main difference is in the method of construction: a brigandine uses rivets to secure the plates, whereas the plates in a jack are sewn in place.  Jacks were often made from recycled pieces of older plate armour, including damaged brigandines and cuirasses cut into small squares.

Jacks remained in use as late as the 16th century and were often worn by Border reivers.  Although they were obsolete by the time of the English Civil War many were taken to the New World by English settlers as they provided excellent protection from Native American arrows; one dating back to 1607 was found at Jamestown in 2008.

Indian "coat of ten thousand nails" 

The medieval Indian equivalent of the brigandine was the chihal'ta hazar masha, or "coat of ten thousand nails", which was a padded leather jacket covered in velvet and containing steel plates which was used until the early 19th century. The skirt was split to the waist, allowing the soldier to ride a horse. Matching vambraces and boots containing metal plates were also used. It was derived from Islamic armour used by the Saracen armies. These were often elaborately decorated with gold lace, silk and satin and are highly prized by European collectors.

Tipu Sultan wore armour of this type during his wars against the East India Company. The Turks used similar armour during the Russo-Turkish Wars.

Two complete suits of armour are preserved in the Hermitage Museum, Saint Petersburg.

Chinese bumianjia  

A type of armour very similar in design to brigandine, known as bumianjia (Chinese:布面甲; Pinyin: Bù miàn jiǎ), or dingjia (Chinese: 釘甲; Pinyin: Dīng jiǎ), was used in medieval China. It consisted of rectangular metal plates riveted between the fabric layers with the rivet heads visible on the outside.

He also argues that Eastern European  and, supposedly, Western European brigandines originate from this armour.

Bumianjia were still used in China as late as the Ming and Qing periods. It was favoured by common soldiers and officers alike for its rich, expensive look and protection. Later Qing examples, however, often lacked iron plates and were merely a military uniform.

Russian kuyak 

The word "kuyak" is itself a derivative from the Mongol , which means "armour" (of any type). No known intact examples of this type of armour survives, but historical depictions, textual descriptions and photos remain.

The descriptions, while not offering any in-depth details of the 's construction, suggest a textile body armour reinforced with iron plates, usually not specifying directly their placement, only mentioning the "nails" (rivets) which attached the plates to the cloth.  This was often worn with faulds, pauldrons and arm protection (rerebraces and vambraces), sometimes covered in expensive textiles like sateen, velvet or damask and decorated with fur.

Some  had large "mirror" plates or "shields" attached to the outside. Some descriptions also mention cotton wool padding.

There were also brigandine helmets called "kuyak hats" that used the same principle of construction as the  body armour.

Serbian toke

Clothes with sewn in pieces of metal, used by the Serbian revolutionaries in the uprising against the Ottoman rule (1804–1813, 1814, 1815–1817)

Toke were also worn decoratively, in which case were made of silver and gold.

One of the famous leaders of the rising Uzun Mirko Apostolović wears the Toke in his famous portrait by Uroš Knežević

Japanese kikko armour
Kikko is the Japanese form of brigandine. Kikko are hexagonal plates made from iron or hardened leather and sewn to cloth. These plates were either hidden by a layer of cloth or left exposed.  Kikko were used only relatively recently, during the 16th century.

Kikko comes in many forms including coats, vests, gloves, arm and thigh protectors, and helmet neck guards.  Kikko armour was worn as a standalone defense or under other types of armour as additional protection.

Korean Dujeong-gap (두정갑) 
The Korean Dujeong-gap is the Korean equivalent of brigandine worn by the Joseon Army and Navy. In the late Joseon dynasty, the Dujeong-gap became the primary form of Korean metallic armor and often reached below the knees when worn. The helmet assumes a conical shape and has three brigandine neck defenses attached to the sides and back of the helmet. The exterior fabric of the Dujeong-gap varied; however, examples from the 18th century onwards show the usage of red cotton flannel, red velvet, and yellow cotton (often used for less decorated armors worn by lower-ranking officers and soldiers). The plates used within the Dujeong-gap also varied and could be made of either iron, copper, or leather. Dujeong-gaps with metal plates were worn by the Pengbaesu, and the Gabsa, while Dujeong-gaps with leather plates were part of a set of leather armor worn by peasants called pigabju.

See also 
 Coat of plates
 Jack of plate
 Plated mail
 Mirror armour
 Components of medieval armour

References

External links 

 Hans Memling triptych wing depicting brigandine, c 1470
 Oriental Brigandines at The Silk Road Designs Armoury (same site at the internet archive)
 Rajput armour

Asian armour
Medieval armour
Body armor
Western plate armour